Cnemidophyllum lineatum is a species of insect from the genus Cnemidophyllum.

References

Phaneropterinae